Paulistano Futebol Clube, commonly known as Paulistano, is a Brazilian football club based in Paulista, Pernambuco state. They competed in the Série C twice.

History
The club was founded on August 7, 1982.

Stadium
Paulistano Futebol Clube play their home games at Estádio Ademir Cunha. The stadium has a maximum capacity of 7,000 people.

References

Football clubs in Pernambuco
Association football clubs established in 1959
1959 establishments in Brazil